Pedro Nuno Vieira Duarte (born 19 February 1972), shortened to Pedro Duarte is a retired Portuguese football goalkeeper. He played on the Portuguese second tier for Fátima. Earlier, he spent two seasons in Estrela Amadora and played one cup match.

References

1972 births
Living people
Portuguese footballers
A.C. Marinhense players
S.C. Pombal players
C.F. Estrela da Amadora players
C.D. Fátima players
Association football goalkeepers
Liga Portugal 2 players